Thomas Herschmiller (born April 6, 1978 in Comox, British Columbia) is a Canadian rower. He graduated from Brentwood College School in 1996. He won a gold medal at the 2003 world championships in Milan, Italy and a silver in the same event at the 2004 Summer Olympics.

See also
 Princeton University Olympians

References

1978 births
Living people
Canadian male rowers
Olympic rowers of Canada
Rowers at the 2000 Summer Olympics
Rowers at the 2004 Summer Olympics
Sportspeople from British Columbia
Canadian people of German descent
Olympic silver medalists for Canada
Princeton University alumni
University of Sydney alumni
Olympic medalists in rowing
Medalists at the 2004 Summer Olympics
21st-century Canadian people